Marina Point is a low rocky point which forms the northwestern tip of Galindez Island in the Argentine Islands of the Wilhelm Archipelago. It was first surveyed in 1935-36 by the British Graham Land Expedition under Rymill and named by members of the expedition for Princess Marina, later Duchess of Kent, who was married in November 1934, while the ship Penola was en route to the Argentine Islands.

References

Graham Land